The 1958–59 Istanbul Football League was the 34th season of the league and also the last. This season was used to select which teams would compete in the first season of the newly founded Turkish National League. Eight teams would be picked. Fenerbahçe SK became champions for the 16th time in their history.

Season

References

Istanbul Football League seasons
Turkey
2